Bellin Health is a health care service headquartered in Green Bay, Wisconsin. Bellin Health serves northeastern Wisconsin and the Upper Peninsula of Michigan.

History
In 1908, Dr. Julius Bellin founded the Deaconess Sanitarium in a house he owned in Green Bay, Wisconsin. The next year, the hospital began an affiliation with the Methodist Church.

In 1915, the Deaconess Sanitarium was renamed Wisconsin Deaconess Sanitarium. In 1916, they built their first hospital building. In 1923, they built a north wing addition.

In 1925, the board of directors renamed the hospital Bellin Memorial Hospital over Dr. Bellin's objections as a tribute to him. Dr. Bellin died in 1928.

In 1970, the hospital began Green Bay's first alcohol and drug abuse program. In 1977, the hospital sponsored the first annual Bellin Run. In 1989, they founded the Bellin Psychiatric Center. In January 1994, Bellin opened their first Family Medical Center in Denmark, Wisconsin.

In 2005, Bellin became one of the first hospitals to begin robotic assisted surgery. In 2006, Bellin Health opened their first FastCare clinics in area Shopko stores. In 2007, the company became the official health care partners of the Green Bay Packers.

From 2011 to 2013, Bellin participated in the Pioneer ACO program in partnership with Thedacare. In 2012, Bellin Health expanded and opened their new emergency department on the north side of the Bellin Hospital building. In June 2014, Bellin joined Blue Priority — Anthem Blue Cross and Blue Shield's ACO in Wisconsin.

In 2016, Bellin Health broke ground on a new sports medicine and orthopedics clinic in the Green Bay Packers Titletown District. Also in 2016, Holy Family Memorial joined Bellin Health Partners. In January, the company was accepted into the Medicare and Medicaid Next Generation Accountable Care Organization Model pilot program.

In 2018, Dr. Cynthia Lasecki was named chief medical officer of the company.

In 2022, Bellin began operations as one company with Gundersen Health System.

Medical operations
Bellin Health operates hospitals in Green Bay and Oconto, Wisconsin,

Bellin Health also operates 27 Family Medicals Center clinics in northeastern Wisconsin.

As of 2019, Bellin Health operated four FastCare clinics. The clinics leased space inside Shopko stores prior to Shopko filing for bankruptcy in January 2019. In May, Bellin announced that three of its clinics would consolidate and that new locations had been found.

Bellin Health is affiliated with Bellin College.

On June 6, 2022 Bellin announced that it intended to merge with Gundersen Health System.

See also
List of hospitals in Wisconsin

References

Companies based in Green Bay, Wisconsin
Hospital networks in the United States
Healthcare in Wisconsin
1908 establishments in Wisconsin
Medical and health organizations based in Wisconsin